The 2018 NCAA Bowling Championship was the 15th edition of the NCAA Bowling Championship, an annual tournament to determine the national champion of women's NCAA collegiate ten-pin bowling. The tournament was played at the Tropicana Lanes in St. Louis, Missouri from April 12–14, 2018.

Qualification
Since there is only one national collegiate championship for women's bowling, all NCAA bowling programs (whether from Division I, Division II, or Division III) were eligible. A total of ten teams contested the championship (six automatically qualifying conference champions and four at-large bids), which consisted of a modified double-elimination style tournament.

Bids

Tournament bracket

Play-in rounds

Championship tournament

References

NCAA Bowling Championship
2018 in American sports
2018 in bowling
2018 in sports in Missouri
April 2018 sports events in the United States